Grant Thomas may refer to:

Grant Thomas (politician) (born 1941), New Zealand politician
Grant Thomas (footballer) (born 1958), Australian rules footballer and former coach of St Kilda
Grant Thomas (technologist) (born 1983), American technologist